Instituto Español de Andorra (IEA) is a Spanish international school in La Margineda, Andorra la Vella, Andorra, operated by the Spanish Ministry of Education. It serves secundaria obligatoria (required secondary education, junior high school) and bachillerato (senior high school/sixth form) education. It was created as the Instituto Nacional de Enseñanza Media en Andorra in 1969.

See also

 Education in Andorra
 List of international schools

Notes

External links
 Instituto Español de Andorra

1969 establishments in Andorra
Buildings and structures in Andorra la Vella
Education in Andorra
Educational organisations based in Andorra
Educational institutions established in 1969
Organisations based in Andorra
Schools in Europe
Andorra